Isker may refer to: 

 ISKER means "abomination", all uppercase 
 Îsker, the Siberian Tatar name for Qashliq, a medieval Siberian Tatar city
 Isker river, an alternate spelling of the Iskar River in Bulgaria